is a railway station located in Imari, Saga Prefecture, Japan. It is operated by JR Kyushu and is on the Chikuhi Line.

Lines

Station layout 
The station, which is unstaffed, consists of a side platform serving a single track. There is no station building, only a shelter on the platform for waiting passengers.

Adjacent stations

History
The Kitakyushu Railway was nationalised on 1 October 1937 and Japanese Government Railways (JGR) assumed control of the station. JGR renamed the station Momonokawa and designated the track which served it as part of the Chikuhi Line. With the privatization of Japanese National Railways (JNR), the successor of JGR, on 1 April 1987, control of the station passed to JR Kyushu.

Passenger statistics
In fiscal 2015, there were a total of 19,169 boarding passengers, giving a daily average of 53 passengers.

Environs
National Route 498
Imari Matsuura Post office
Imari City Hall Matsuura Branch
Imari City Matsuura Elementary School

References

External links
Momonokawa (JR Kyushu)

Railway stations in Saga Prefecture
Stations of Kyushu Railway Company
Chikuhi Line
Railway stations in Japan opened in 1935